Walter Francis Murphy, Jr. (November 21, 1929 – April 20, 2010) was an American political scientist and writer.

Early life and education 
Born in Charleston, South Carolina, Murphy won a Distinguished Service Cross and was awarded a Purple Heart for his service in the United States Marine Corps during the Korean War, eventually retiring with the rank of colonel. He earned a bachelor's degree from the University of Notre Dame in 1950 and a PhD from the University of Chicago in 1957.

Career 
Murphy taught government at the United States Naval Academy before returning to graduate school. After earning his PhD, he spent a year as a fellow at the Brookings Institution. He held the position of McCormick Professor of Jurisprudence at Princeton University, a chair whose first occupant was Woodrow Wilson. As a professor, he was undergraduate thesis advisor for Samuel Alito. His professional writing, consisting mostly of non-fiction works on political science, included Constitutional Democracy: Creating and Maintaining a Just Political Order; he has also written three popular novels, including The Vicar of Christ.

Personal life 
Murphy died of cancer at age 80. Murphy's name was on the "Selectee List".

References

Sources
The Charleston Post and Courier
The New York Times

1929 births
2010 deaths
Writers from Charleston, South Carolina
Military personnel from Charleston, South Carolina
American political scientists
American political writers
United States Marine Corps personnel of the Korean War
United States Marine Corps colonels
Recipients of the Distinguished Service Cross (United States)
Deaths from cancer in South Carolina